Maria Cristina Pacheco Rodrigues (born 14 June 1985) is a Portuguese politician who was elected to the Assembly of the Republic by the Setúbal District in 2019.

Rodrigues has worked in victim support and as a pro bono lawyer for domestic violence victims. In July 2019, she was chosen as list leader for People Animals Nature in Setúbal District, ahead of the elections in October. She and three other women from PAN were elected, joining party leader André Lourenço e Silva in the Assembly of the Republic.

On 25 June 2020, Rodrigues quit PAN, due to objections to Silva's alleged authoritarianism, and sat as an independent. She became only the second independent at the time, along with Joacine Katar Moreira, whose membership of Livre had been rescinded. Her resignation came days after that of PAN's only Member of the European Parliament, Francisco Guerreiro. Later that year, she abstained, so that the state budget would pass, saying: "I will let it happen, but I won't vote in favour of it".

On 23 March 2022, Rodrigues was announced as a new member of the legal department of the far-right party Chega.

References

1985 births
Living people
Portuguese women lawyers
Members of the Assembly of the Republic (Portugal)
Women members of the Assembly of the Republic (Portugal)
People Animals Nature politicians